This is a list of Superleague Formula football clubs. Twenty-three cars sporting liveries of famous football clubs mainly from Europe but also from Asia and South America have started at least one race in Superleague Formula. A further eight cars with liveries in the colours of nations have also competed. This list is accurate up to and including the final round of the 2010 championship at Navarra.

Football clubs' summary

Football clubs' race statistics
Races 1 and 2

Super Finals

Total

Race 3 (the Super Final) results apply only for certain rounds: Magny-Cours, Donington Park, Estoril and Jarama in 2009, and every race in 2010. Points for the Super Final were only awarded in 2010. The above table may not be fully representative of the truth in a clubs' performance due to the points scoring system change that happened prior to the 2010 season. Fluctuations in the number of clubs taking part in any given race and the total number of races any club has taken part in overall may also lead to statistical misrepresentations in the data.

References

External links
 Superleague Formula Official Website
 V12 Racing: Independent Superleague Formula Fansite Magazine